Briggs is a Northern English surname found mainly in West Yorkshire and derives from the Old Norse word bryggja meaning 'bridge', and could also be related to the British Brigantes which once settled Yorkshire in the ancient Brythonic kingdom of Brigantia. Notable people with the surname include:

Adam Briggs, stage name Briggs (rapper), Australian rapper
Alfie Briggs (1888–1952), Scottish footballer
Allan Briggs (businessman), founder of Briggs Communications
Allan Briggs (1873–1951), American Olympic sport shooter
Andrew Briggs (George Andrew Davidson Briggs, born 1950) British scientist
Andy Briggs (born 1972), British author and screenwriter
Andy Briggs (businessman) (born 1966), British insurance executive
Ann-Kio Briggs (born 1952), English-born Nigerian environmental and human rights activist
Anne Briggs (born 1944), English folk singer
Annie M. Briggs (born 1987), Canadian actress
Ansel Briggs (1806–1881), American politician
Arthur E. Briggs (1881–1969), California teacher, law school dean and politician
Asa Briggs (1921–2016), English historian
Barbara G. Briggs (born 1934), Australian botanist
Barry Briggs (born 1934), New Zealand World Motorcycle speedway champion
Benjamin Briggs (1835–1872), captain of the Mary Celeste
Bill Briggs (disambiguation), multiple people, including:
Bill Briggs (defensive end) (born 1943), American footballer
Bill Briggs (American football coach), American football coach
Bill Briggs (Canadian football), Canadian football player
Bill Briggs (skier), American extreme skier and ski school director
Billy Briggs (born 1977), American musician
Bob Briggs (American football) (1945–1997), in American Football League and NFL
Bob Briggs (Australian footballer) (1883–1955), Australian rules footballer
Bob Briggs (chemist) (1905–1975), New Zealand organic chemist
Carlos Briggs (born 1964), American basketball player
Charles Briggs (disambiguation), multiple people
 Charles Briggs (cricketer) (1873–1949), Hampshire cricketer
 Charles Briggs (Royal Navy officer) (1858–1951), British admiral
 Charles A. Briggs, Central Intelligence Agency Office of Inspector General, 1982
 Charles Augustus Briggs (1841–1913), American Hebrew scholar and theologian
 Charles Frederick Briggs (1804–1877), American journalist, "Harry Franco"
 Charles James Briggs (1865–1941), British Major-General
 Charles L. Briggs (born 1953), American anthropologist
Charlie Briggs (actor) (1932–1985), American actor
Charlie Briggs (baseball) (1860–1920), baseball player
Charlie Briggs (footballer) (1911–1993), English football goalkeeper
Chuck Briggs (1960–2000), American punk rock guitarist
Clare Briggs (1875–1930), American comics artist
Danny Briggs (born 1991), English cricketer
Dave Briggs (journalist) (born 1976), American television news anchor
David Briggs (disambiguation), multiple people
 David Briggs, inventor of Who Wants to Be a Millionaire?
 David Briggs (American musician) (born 1943), American keyboardist and record producer
 David Briggs (Australian musician) (born 1951), Australian guitarist with Little River Band
 David Briggs (English musician) (born 1962), English organist and composer
 David Briggs (headmaster) (1917–2020), English headmaster of King's College School, Cambridge
 David Briggs (record producer) (1944–1995), American record producer
 David Briggs, High Sheriff of Cheshire
 David T. Briggs (born 1954), president of Erie Plating Company
Derek Briggs (born 1950), Irish paleontologist
Everett Francis Briggs (1908–2006), American Catholic priest and miners' activist
Frank Briggs (disambiguation), several people, including
Francis Stewart Briggs (1897–1966), Australian aviator
Frank Briggs (footballer) (1917–1984), English soccer player
Frank A. Briggs (1858–1898), American Governor of the state of North Dakota
Frank O. Briggs (1851–1913), U.S. Senator from New Jersey
Frank P. Briggs (1894–1992), U.S. Senator from Missouri
Gary Briggs (musician), British guitarist
Gary Briggs (footballer) (born 1959), British footballer
George N. Briggs, American politician
Gilbert Briggs (1890–1978), English founder of Wharfedale loudspeakers
Greg Briggs (born 1968), American football player
Harlan Briggs (1879–1952), American actor
Harold Briggs (disambiguation), multiple people
Harold Douglas Briggs (1877–1944), senior Royal Navy and Royal Air Force officer
Harold Rawdon Briggs, director of operations for the British Army in Malaya 1950–1951
Harold Briggs (politician) (1870–1945), British Conservative Member of Parliament
Henry Briggs (disambiguation), multiple people
Henry Briggs (mathematician) (1561–1630),  English mathematician
Henry Perronet Briggs (1793–1844), English painter
Henry Shaw Briggs (1824–1887), Union Army general in the American Civil War
Sir Henry Briggs (politician) (1844–1919), Australian politician
Henry Briggs (footballer) (1871–1913), English footballer
Ian Briggs (born 1958), British television writer
Jack Briggs (disambiguation)
 Jack Briggs (broadcaster), American radio broadcaster
 Jack Briggs (cricketer) (1916–1984), English cricketer
 Jack Briggs (actor) (1920–1998), husband of American actress Ginger Rogers
James Briggs (disambiguation), any of several people
 James Briggs (musician) (born 1978), American keyboardist and saxophonist
 James E. Briggs (1906–1979), United States Air Force general
 James Frankland Briggs (1827–1905), United States Representative from New Hampshire
Jamie Briggs (born 1977), Australian politician
Jason W. Briggs (1821–1899), American Latter Day Saint leader
Jean Briggs (1929–2016), American-born Canadian anthropologist, ethnographer and linguist
Jeff Briggs (born 1957), American composer and former computer games executive
Jimmy Briggs (1937–2011), Scottish footballer
Joe Bob Briggs, pseudonym of John Irving Bloom (born 1953), American film critic and actor
John Briggs (disambiguation), multiple people by the name of John, Johnny, and other variations
John Briggs (author), American author and university lecturer
John Briggs (baseball) (1934–2018), American baseball pitcher
John Briggs (bishop) (1789–1861), Vicar Apostolic of the Northern District of England
John Briggs (East India Company officer) (1785–1875), British officer and author
John Briggs (politician) (1930–2020), American politician
John Briggs, activist from Florida, member of the Gainesville Eight
John Joseph Briggs (1819–1876), writer
John Q. Briggs (1848–1921), American Republican State Senator (1907–1911)
John R. Briggs Jr. (1822–1872), American politician in Wisconsin
John Thomas Briggs (1781–1865), accountant-general of the Royal Navy
Johnny Briggs (cricketer) (1862–1902), English cricketer
Johnny Briggs (actor) (1935–2021), English actor in soap opera Coronation Street
Johnny Briggs (baseball) (born 1944), American former baseball outfielder
Jon Briggs (born 1965), English voice actor and journalist
Jonny Briggs, eponymous character in a BBC children's television programme, first broadcast in 1985
Josephine Briggs, American nephrologist
Karen Briggs (disambiguation), multiple people
 Karen Briggs (musician) (born 1963), American violinist
 Karen Briggs (judoka) (born 1963), British judoka
Katharine Cook Briggs (1875–1968), American co-inventor of the Myers-Briggs personality test
Katharine Mary Briggs (1898–1980), British author
Kenneth Briggs (born 1933), English cricketer and RAF officer
Kevin "She'kspere" Briggs, American record producer
Kim Briggs (handballer) (born 1977), Australian handball player and coach
Lance Briggs (born 1980), American football player
Lauren Briggs (born 1979), English squash player
LeBaron Russell Briggs (1855–1934), American educator
Leland Lawrence Briggs (1893–1975), American accounting scholar
Lyman James Briggs (1874–1963), American physicist and civil servant
Margaret Jane Briggs (1892–1961), New Zealand show-ring rider
Mary Blatchley Briggs (1846– 1910), American writer and women's organizer
Matt Briggs (born 1970), American writer
Matthew Briggs (born 1991), English footballer
Melancthon J. Briggs (1846–1923), American politician
Michael Briggs (disambiguation), multiple people
Michael Peter Briggs (scientist) (born 1944), British scientist and university administrator
Michael Briggs, Lord Briggs of Westbourne, British judge
Michael Briggs (police officer), police officer from New Hampshire, shot in 2006
Michael Briggs, Lord Briggs of Westbourne (born 1954),  judge in England and Wales
Michael Briggs (racing driver) (born 1966), South African racing driver
Mike Briggs (politician) (born 1959), American politician
Mike Briggs (tennis) (born 1968), American tennis player
Nicholas Briggs (born 1961), British actor
Nimi Briggs (born 1944), Nigerian academic
Patricia Briggs (born 1965), American fantasy writer
Patrick Briggs (born 1940), English cricketer, rugby player and school headmaster
Paul Briggs (disambiguation), multiple people
 Paul Briggs (American football) (1920–2011), American football tackle
 Paul Briggs (animator) (born 1974), American artist, animator, and voice actor
 Paul Briggs (boxer) (born 1975), Australian
Perry R. Briggs (1825–1918), American politician in Wisconsin
Raymond Briggs (1934–2022), English illustrator and author
Robert Briggs (disambiguation), several people
 Robert Briggs (scientist) (1911–1983), cloning pioneer
 Robert Briggs (American football) (born 1941), American football player
 Robert Briggs (character), Hollywood screenwriter 
 Robert Briggs (MP) (died 1615), MP for Boroughbridge
 Robert Briggs (poet) (1929–2015), American poet
 Robert Briggs (publisher), American author and publisher, for Straight Arrow Press
 Robert H. Briggs, American lawyer and historian
 Robert O. Briggs (1927–2008), director of the University of California Marching Band
 Robert P. Briggs (1903–1998), American businessman
 Robert William Briggs (1911–1983), American biologist
Shannon Briggs (born 1971), American boxer
Stephen Briggs (born 1951), British Discworld adapter
Stephen Foster Briggs (1885–1976), American engineer, co-founder of the Briggs & Stratton Company
Ted Briggs (1923–2008), British seaman, survivor of HMS Hood
Thomas Briggs (disambiguation), multiple people
 Thomas Briggs (coach), American football coach
 Thomas Briggs (Royal Navy officer) (1780–1852), British naval officer
 Thomas Briggs (died 1864), British banker, murdered by Franz Müller
 Sir Thomas Graham Briggs (1833–1887), of the Briggs baronets, member Executive Council of Barbados
Tom Briggs (disambiguation), multiple people
Tom Briggs (footballer) (1919–1999), English footballer
Tom Briggs (gridiron football) (born 1970), American football player
Tommy Briggs (1923–1984), English footballer
Walter Briggs (disambiguation), multiple people
Walter Briggs Sr. (1877–1952), owner of the Detroit Tigers and Briggs Manufacturing Company
Walter Briggs Jr. (1912–1970), son of Walter Briggs Sr. and owner of the Detroit Tigers
William Briggs (disambiguation)
William Briggs (physician) (1642–1704), English physician and oculist
William Edward Briggs (1847–1903), English cotton manufacturer and Liberal politician
Sir William Edward Briggs Priestley (1859–1932), Liberal politician
William B. Briggs (born 1954), subject matter expert in sports and entertainment law
William Briggs (publisher) (1836–1922), Irish-born Canadian Methodist minister and publisher
William Perry Briggs (1856–1928), English medical officer of health
William James Harold Briggs, (Harold Briggs (politician) 1870–1945), British Conservative
William Ronald Briggs, (Ronnie Briggs 1943–2008), Northern Irish footballer
William Briggs, Canadian book publishing imprint later known as Ryerson Press

Fictional characters
Bobby Briggs, fictional character in American television series Twin Peaks
Calico "Callie" Briggs, fictional character in SWAT Kats: The Radical Squadron
Charlie Briggs (One Life to Live)
Hortense Briggs, fictional character in An American Tragedy by Theodore Dreiser
Major Garland Briggs, fictional character in Twin Peaks
Jacqui Briggs, character in the arcade/videogame series Mortal Kombat
Jackson "Jax" Briggs, character in the arcade/videogame series Mortal Kombat
Jonny Briggs, main character of eponymous BBC children's drama 1985–1987 
Kim Briggs (Scrubs), mother of J.D.'s baby in American TV comedy-drama Scrubs
Randolph Briggs, fictional character in the American television series Alice, played by Hans Conried.
Sandra Briggs, fictional character in British soap opera Emmerdale
Miss Briggs, character in American television series iCarly
Uncle Briggs, host of an American children's television series which aired on WSIL-TV

See also
Biggs (surname)
Bridget (name)
Briggs (disambiguation)

Surnames
English-language surnames
Surnames of English origin
Surnames of Scottish origin
Surnames of British Isles origin